Oleksandr Andriyevich (or Aleksandr Andreyevich) Berezhnoy (born 8 December 1957 in Krasnodon) is a retired Soviet football player.

Honours
 Soviet Top League winner: 1977.
 Soviet Cup winner: 1978.

International career
Berezhnoy made his debut for USSR on 28 November 1976 in a friendly against Argentina. He played in qualifiers for the UEFA Euro 1980 (USSR did not qualify for the final tournament).

In 1979 Berezhnoy played couple of games for Ukraine at the Spartakiad of the Peoples of the USSR.

References

External links
  Profile

1957 births
Living people
Soviet footballers
Soviet Union international footballers
FC Dynamo Kyiv players
SC Tavriya Simferopol players
Ukrainian footballers
Soviet Top League players
Association football defenders
Association football midfielders